Moultrieville Historic District is a national historic district located at Sullivan's Island, Charleston County, South Carolina. The district encompasses 18 contributing buildings and 1 contributing site in Moultrieville.  They predominantly include frame residences built between about 1830 to 1930 which are known as "Island Houses." Also located in the district are the Stella Maris Catholic Church (1869-1873) and Fort Moultrie Torpedo Shed/Mines Storehouse (c. 1905).

It was listed on the National Register of Historic Places in 2007.

References

Historic districts on the National Register of Historic Places in South Carolina
Buildings and structures in Charleston County, South Carolina
National Register of Historic Places in Charleston County, South Carolina